Long Marston is a village and civil parish about  southwest of Stratford-upon-Avon in Warwickshire, England. The southern and western boundaries of the parish form part of the county boundary with Worcestershire. The 2011 Census recorded the parish's population as 436.

History
Long Marston was part of Gloucestershire until 1931, when the Provisional Order Confirmation (Gloucestershire, Warwickshire and Worcestershire) Act Warwickshire. The civil parish was also renamed from "Marston Sicca" to "Long Marston" in 1931. It is recorded in the Domesday Book "In Celfledetorn Hundred, St. Mary's Priory and Cathedral in Merestone, holds 10 hides. In lordship 3 ploughs; 15 villagers and 3 smallholders with 12 ploughs. 6 slaves; meadow at 10s. The value was £8; now 100s. The name of the hundred, Celfledethon means Ceolflaeds thorn, perhaps indicating that the original meeting place in the centre of the hundred was a thorn tree.

Long Marston is known as one of the "Shakespeare villages". William Shakespeare is said to have joined a party of Stratford folk which set itself to outdrink a drinking club at Bidford-on-Avon, and as a result of his labours in that regard to have fallen asleep under the crab tree of which a descendant is still called Shakespeare's tree. When morning dawned his friends wished to renew the encounter but he wisely said "No I have drunk with Piping Pebworth, Dancing Marston, Haunted Hillboro’, Hungry Grafton, Dodging Exhall, Papist Wixford, Beggarly Broom and Drunken Bidford' and so, presumably, I will drink no more." The story is said to date from the 17th century but of its truth or of any connection of the story or the verse to Shakespeare there is no evidence.

On 10 September 1651 Charles II stayed in Long Marston at the house of a kinsman of Jane Lane called Tomes, on his way from Bentley Hall to Abbots Leigh during his escape following the defeat of the army at the Battle of Worcester. He was traveling incognito as a servant to Jane Lane, sister-in-law of George Norton, the owner of the house at Abbott's Leigh to which they were bound. In keeping with his outward guise as a servant, the cook of the house put him to work in the kitchen winding up the jack used to roast meat in the fireplace. Charles was very clumsy at this, but explained his clumsiness by saying that as the son of poor people, he so rarely ate meat that he did not know how to use a roasting jack. Given the state of the economy at the time, his story was accepted and he was not identified.

Parish church
The Church of England parish church of Saint James the Great has a 14th-century Decorated Gothic nave and chancel, but was rebuilt in the 19th century. The pulpit is Jacobean. The church is a Grade I listed building. Its parish is part of the Benefice of Quinton, Welford-on-Avon, Weston-on-Avon and Marston Sicca.

Railway
Long Marston railway station opened at the same time as one of the stops on the line. In 1966 British Railways withdrew passenger services between Honeybourne and Stratford, closed Long Marston station and removed the track between Long Marston and Stratford. The line between Honeybourne and Long Marston remains open for non-passenger trains to and from the former MoD depot.

Long Marston Military Railway (LMMR) was a project at the MoD depot to keep alive military railway skills. A "Military Railfest" was planned for 6–10 May 2015 which was expected to include about 20 former army locomotives. Barclay 0-4-0 DM Mulberry was already at Long Marston railway station and was to be joined by USATC S160 Class 2-8-0 number 3278 on 22 April 2014. The project had been using the shed vacated by the Stratford on Avon and Broadway Railway. In March 2015, it was reported that the project had collapsed and that the majority of the site would be redeveloped for housing, with sidings retained for the storage of London Underground District line stock for Vivarail's conversion into British Rail Class 230 multiple units.

The scheme faces local opposition. There is, however, a good business case for Stratford-Cotswolds link.

Airfield
Long Marston Airfield is north-east of the village. It was built in 1940 as RAF Long Marston and decommissioned as a military airfield in 1958. Since 1987 the airfield has been the venue of the Bulldog Bash, considered to be one of Europe's most popular annual motorcycle festivals. Since 2001 the airfield has also been the venue of the annual Global Gathering club music festival.

Former military depot
Long Marston depot is a former Ministry of Defence facility south-east of the village. Since the privatisation of British Rail in the mid-1990s, rolling stock companies (ROSCOs) have used the depot to store out-of-lease rolling stock. In about 2009 the depot's owners, St. Modwen Properties, along with The Bird Group of Companies, proposed to redevelop the site as Middle Quinton Eco-town. In 2021, it was announced that Porterbrook had leased the site for rail rolling stock storage.

Amenities
Long Marston has a public house, the Mason's Arms, and a community shop called the "Poppin".

References

Villages in Warwickshire
Civil parishes in Warwickshire
Stratford-on-Avon District
World War II prisoner of war camps in England